Wanda Jablonski (23 August 1920, in Czechoslovakia – 28 January 1992, in New York City) was an American journalist who covered the global petroleum industry. She was called "the most influential oil journalist of her time" in Daniel Yergin's The Prize.

Early life and education 
Jablonski was the daughter of Polish petroleum geologist Eugene Jablonski, and was immersed in the oil industry throughout her childhood.  She studied at St George's School, Harpenden in England until July 1937, where she gained her school certificate and got the form prize in July 1938 before leaving to study in America.

She and her parents traveled widely, and although she became an American citizen, she developed great sympathy for other cultures – an attribute which as an adult enabled her to make deep contacts across the world oil industry, from the multinational oil companies to the leaders of oil-producing countries.

Jablonski earned a B.A. from Cornell University in 1942 and an M.A. from the Columbia University Graduate School of Journalism the following year.

Career 
Jablonski began as the oil editor at the Journal of Commerce, where she made her mark  with a 1948 interview in Caracas with Juan Pablo Pérez Alfonso, then the Venezuelan oil minister, which cleverly synthesized the developing nations' viewpoint, in those days rarely heard in the Western hemisphere. She moved to Petroleum Week journal in 1954 and cemented her reputation, speaking on equal terms with oil ministers and company chairmen. A rare woman in a man's world, she was known throughout the oil industry simply as "Wanda".

She is credited with arranging the 1959 Cairo meeting where Abdullah Tariki, Juan Pablo Pérez Alfonso, and other oil ministers of Middle East signed the "Gentleman’s Agreement," a precursor of Organization of the Petroleum Exporting Countries (OPEC), the international organization whose mission is to coordinate the policies of the oil-producing countries. In 1960, Jablonski reported to oil company executives that there was a marked hostility toward the West and a growing outcry against "absentee landlordism" in the Middle East. "From offices in London, New York and Pittsburgh, top executives of oil companies were controlling destinies of Middle East oil-producing states." Ignoring her warning, in August 1960 the major oil companies unilaterally reduced the prices that were used to calculate how much revenue the producing countries received. As a direct result, in September 1960, representatives from oil-producing countries met and formed OPEC.

She then founded Petroleum Intelligence Weekly in 1961, the journal which came to be known as "the bible of the oil industry", and ran it until 1988.

Jablonski died in 1992 of heart failure at the age of 71.

References

Further reading
 

1920 births
1992 deaths
American women journalists
American people of Polish descent
20th-century American writers
20th-century American women writers
Columbia University Graduate School of Journalism alumni
Cornell University alumni
People in the petroleum industry
Petroleum economics
20th-century American journalists
Czechoslovak expatriates in the United Kingdom
Czechoslovak emigrants to the United States